Lava is a 2001 British black comedy directed by Joe Tucker.

The film competed at the Alexandria International Film Festival, Filmfest Oldenburg, Austin Film Festival and Rome Independent Film Festival in 2001.

References

External links

 Variety Review
 Aint-it-cool

2001 films
2001 black comedy films
British black comedy films
Sterling Pictures films
2001 comedy films
2000s English-language films
2000s British films